The Italian general election of 1958 took place on 25 May 1958.

Christian Democracy (DC) was by far the largest party in Veneto with 55.5%, while the Italian Socialist Party (PSI) came distant second with 16.1%. Veneto was thus one of the few regions of Italy where the Socialists were stronger than the Italian Communist Party (PCI), even without counting the Italian Democratic Socialist Party (PSDI).

Results

Chamber of Deputies
Source: Regional Council of Veneto

Provincial breakdown
Source: Regional Council of Veneto

Senate
Source: Regional Council of Veneto

Elections in Veneto
General, Veneto